Catocala alabamae, the Alabama underwing  or titan underwing, is a moth of the  family Erebidae. It is found from Louisiana, Maryland south to Florida, west to Texas and north to Missouri, Wisconsin Pennsylvania and Illinois.

The wingspan is 20–40 mm. Adults are on wing from April to August depending on the location. There is probably one generation per year.

The larvae feed on Crataegus, Crataegus calpodendron, Malus coronaria and Prunus angustifolia.

References

External links
Species info
Species info

Moths described in 1875
alabamae
Moths of North America